Aloysius College is the name of several Roman Catholic educational institutions, named for Saint Aloysius Gonzaga, including:
Aloisiuskolleg in Bad Godesberg, Germany
Aloysius College, The Hague
Mount Aloysius College in Cresson, Pennsylvania

See also
St Aloysius' College (disambiguation)